Hadesina caerulescens is a moth of the family Notodontidae first described by William Schaus in 1913. It is found in Costa Rica and Panama.

References

Moths described in 1913
Notodontidae